The 2010 Dalian Shide F.C. season was Dalian's 21st consecutive season in the top division of Chinese football.

Players 
As of 23 March 2010

Chinese Super League

League table

Fixtures and results

Squad statistics

Appearances and goals

Goal scorers

Disciplinary record

References 

Dalian Shide F.C. seasons
Dalian Shide F.C.